John Alan Robert Methuen (14 August 1947 – 18 July 2010) was an Anglican priest.

Early life
Methuen was born on 14 August 1947 and educated at Eton College, St John's School, Leatherhead and Brasenose College, Oxford.

Religious career
He was ordained in 1972 and was a curate at Fenny Stratford, after which he was appointed chaplain of Eton College.  He was subsequently vicar of St Mark's Reading then rector of The Ascension, Hulme. While in Hulme he sheltered asylum seeker Viraj Mendis for over two years (December 1986 to January 1989).

His next appointment was as Dean of Ripon in 1995. A divisive figure, he was facing 21 charges of misconduct before a consistory court, but resigned in 2005 before the cases came to court.

Later life
After Ripon, he retired to London where he lectured and attended seminars and tours. His funeral service was held at Saint Bartholomew the Great, Smithfield, London.

References

1947 births
2010 deaths
People educated at Eton College
People educated at St John's School, Leatherhead
Alumni of Brasenose College, Oxford
Deans of Ripon
British Anglo-Catholics
Anglo-Catholic clergy